El Sexo Fuerte is a 1946 Mexican comedy-drama film directed by Emilio Gómez Muriel and starring Mapy Cortés, Rafael Baledón and Ángel Garasa.

References

External links
 

1946 films
1940s Spanish-language films
1946 comedy-drama films
Mexican black-and-white films
Mexican comedy-drama films
1940s Mexican films